Monster Island may refer to:

Film
 Monster Island (2004 film), a television film
 Monster Island (2017 film), an animated film produced by Ánima Estudios
 Monster Island (2019 film), an action film by Mark Atkins
 Monsterland and Monster Island, fictional locations in the Godzilla series

Games
 Monster Island (play-by-mail game), a play-by-mail game active from the 1980s to the 2000s
 Monster Islands, a fictional planet in LittleBigPlanet Karting

Literature
 Monster Island (Buffy/Angel novel), a 2003 novel by Christopher Golden and Thomas E. Sniegoski
 Monster Island (Wellington novel), a 2004 novel by David Wellington
 Monster Isle, the Mole Man's base in the Marvel Comics canon